María Catalina Gómez Sánchez (born September 8, 1984 in Armenia, Quindío) simply known as Catalina Gómez or Catalina Gómez Sánchez, is a Colombian journalist and news presenter.

Gómez studied at the Pontifical Bolivarian University, where she majored in Social communication and journalist, subsequently, she debuted in 2006 in a local radio program, as producer, later, she entered as news reporter and anchor at the cable news channel based-in Bogota, Colombia
NTN 24.

During 2012, she became a press chief of an Institutional program, and later Gómez moved to Colombia, while worked as the official anchor of the Noticias MundoFox in Miami. 
In March 2013, she joined Noticias Caracol as a reporter and substitute anchor, later she passed to the weekends edition, and nowadays is the current First edition co-anchor alongside Juan Diego Alvira. Gómez has been  married since 2010 with the sports journalist Juan Raúl Mejia.

References

External links 

 

1984 births
Living people
Colombian television journalists
Colombian women journalists
Colombian television presenters
People from Quindío Department
Colombian women television journalists
Colombian women television presenters